This is the list of cathedrals in Lithuania sorted by denomination.

Roman Catholic
Cathedrals of the Roman Catholic Church in Lithuania:

Eastern Orthodox
Cathedrals of the Russian Orthodox Church:

See also

List of cathedrals

References

Lithuania
Cathedrals
Cathedrals